Hericenones is a class of benzaldehydes that are isolates of the fruiting body of Hericium erinaceum (lion's mane mushroom) that promote nerve growth factor synthesis in vitro.

Hericenones

References

Benzaldehydes